Barbara McAlister (born 1942) is an internationally acclaimed mezzo-soprano Native American opera singer from Muskogee, Oklahoma.

Background
Barbara McAlister was born Muskogee, Oklahoma, in 1942. She is an enrolled member of the Cherokee Nation, a descendant of Old Tassel, and half German/Cherokee through her mother. She aspired to be a country-western singer in her youth, but learned to love opera from her parents.

For her dedication to promoting the Cherokee language, she was awarded the Cherokee Medal of Honor from the Cherokee Honor Society.

Musical career
She won the Loren Zachary Competition in Los Angeles, which launched her career. She has since performed in the opera houses of Passau, Koblenz, Bremerhaven, and most notably Flensburg, where she was engaged for a decade. She has given solo performances at the Weill Recital Hall in Carnegie Hall, Alice Tully Hall, and has performed with companies throughout Europe and the United States.

Visual arts
McAlister also paints in the Bacone style of flat-style Native painting from Prairie, Plains, and Eastern tribes. She has exhibited her paintings at the Five Civilized Tribes Museum and Jacobson House Native Arts Center in Oklahoma, the Wharton Art Gallery in Philadelphia, and Bullock's in Los Angeles.

References

External links

American operatic mezzo-sopranos
Native American singers
Native American painters
Painters from Oklahoma
Singers from Oklahoma
People from Muskogee, Oklahoma
Cherokee Nation artists
1941 births
Living people
20th-century Native Americans
21st-century Native Americans
20th-century Native American women
21st-century Native American women